John Thomas Lynch (9 August 1918 – 8 September 1944) was an Australian rules footballer who played with Geelong, until he defected to the VFA club Preston without clearance in 1941. He was killed in a motorcar accident while on active service during World War II.

Family
The second child of James Lynch (1887-1976), and Jessie Lynch (1892-1936), née McWilliam, John Thomas Lynch was born at Geelong on 9 August 1918. One of his younger brothers, Marty Lynch also played VFL football: for Geelong and for South Melbourne.

He married Coral Joan Jamieson in 1939. They had two children, Marion and Merlyn.

Education
Following his mother's death he went to live with his aunt and uncle, and was educated at St Joseph's College, Geelong.

Football

Geelong (VFL)
Recruited from the Marnock Vale Football Club in the Geelong and District Football Association in 1938, he spent some time with the Seconds—including his game at full-forward in the Second's 1938 Grand Final win against Footscray (12.19 (91) to 12.8 (80)) at the MCG, on Show Day (29 September 1938)—before making his senior debut, against Carlton, at the Corio Oval, on 29 April 1939.

Preston (VFA)
In 1941 he crossed to Preston in the VFA without a clearance. He played in 21 matches and kicked 132 goals in his single season with Preston.

Although he was clearly Preston's leading goal-kicker in 1941, he was not the Associations leading goal-kicker—Coburg's Bob Pratt had kicked 165 goals in the home-and-away season (total 183 goals, including finals matches), Camberwell's Laurie Nash had kicked a total of 141 goals (also Prahran's Roy Lyons had kicked 109 goals, and Williamstown's "Soapy" Vallance had kicked 92 goals).

Death
He died, as the result of an accident, in North Queensland on 8 September 1944: "Lynch and some of his mates were returning [to camp] in the back of a Jeep from a night out in Charters Towers when it ran into a mob of cattle. Lynch was thrown forward onto the Jeep's bonnet, fractured his spine and died shortly after, on September 8, 1944." (Main & Allen, 2002, p. 292).

He was buried in the War Cemetery at Woombye, Queensland.

See also
 List of Victorian Football League players who died in active service

Footnotes

References
 
 Main, J. & Allen, D., "Lynch, Jack", pp. 291–293 in Main, J. & Allen, D., Fallen – The Ultimate Heroes: Footballers Who Never Returned From War, Crown Content, (Melbourne), 2002. 
 World War Two Nominal Roll: Driver John Thomas Lynch (VX77041), 'National Archives of Australia.
 Roll of Honour: Private John Thomas Lynch (VX77041), Australian War Memorial.

External links
 
 
 J.T. "Jack" Lynch, at The VFA Project.

1918 births
1944 deaths
Australian rules footballers from Geelong
Geelong Football Club players
Preston Football Club (VFA) players
Australian military personnel killed in World War II
Road incident deaths in Queensland
Australian Army personnel of World War II
Australian Army soldiers
Military personnel from Victoria (Australia)